Michael Radulescu (born 19 June 1943) is a Romanian-German composer, organist, and professor.

He was born to a Romanian father and a German mother. He studied with Anton Heiller and Hans Swarowsky at the University of Music and Performing Arts in Vienna, Austria.

References

University of Music and Performing Arts Vienna alumni
1943 births
Living people
Romanian expatriates in Austria